Events in the year 1985 in Cyprus.

Incumbents 

 President: Demetris Christofias
 President of the Parliament: Yiannakis Omirou

Events 
Ongoing – Cyprus dispute

 8 December – Democratic Rally won 19 of the 56 seats in the parliament following parliamentary elections. Voter turnout was 94.6%.

Deaths

References 

 
1980s in Cyprus
Years of the 21st century in Cyprus
Cyprus
Cyprus
Cyprus